Simon Pilton is a British songwriter and record producer. Best known for his work with David Jordan, achieving a number 4 hit in the UK Singles Chart with "Sun Goes Down" and a certified gold album with David Jordan, Set the Mood, to which he contributed the tracks "Sun Goes Down" and "Sweet Prince".

In 2009, one of his songs "Wanda" was featured in the Eddie Izzard documentary I Believe. He had previously worked with Izzard providing music for his stage show and subsequent DVD release Definite Article.

In 2010, he was signed to Mike Chapman's publishing company, Chapman Rocks, and worked extensively with FKA Twigs Ekkah, Vei and Suzi Quatro.

He is currently working in artist development, writing and producing with Abisha. He co-wrote and/or produced all four singles to date. "All That", "Project X", "Nothing Matters" and the latest release "Confused".

References

British songwriters
Year of birth missing (living people)
Living people